Laura Kinsale is an American writer of historical romance novels since 1985.

Biography
Kinsale has a Master of Science in Geology from the University of Texas at Austin. She worked in the petroleum industry before beginning to write. Now, she is a winner and multiple nominee for the Best Book of the Year award given by the Romance Writers of America.

She once characterized the oft-derided happy ending in romance novels as an "integration of the inner self."

Career 
Kinsale is the creator of Hedgehog Inc., which publishes audiobooks written by Kinsale and other authors, narrated by Nicholas Boulton and produced by The Story Circle, London. Several of the audiobooks released by Hedgehog Inc have been winners or nominees for AudioFile Earphones Awards.

Awards
The Prince of Midnight: 1991 Rita Awards Best Novel winner
Shadowheart: 2005 Rita Awards Best Historical Novel winner
Midsummer Moon: 2013 Audiofile Magazine Earphones Award, Best Voices, Fiction and Classics
My Sweet Folly: 2013 Audiofile Magazine Earphones Award, Best Voices, Fiction and Classics
The Shadow and the Star: 2013 Audiofile Magazine Earphones Award, Best Voices, Fiction and Classics 
For My Lady’s Heart: by Laura Kinsale; Narrated by Nicholas Boulton; Hedgehog, Inc.; Audio Publishers Association, 2014 Best Romance Finalist

Bibliography
Uncertain Magic, (1987/Mar)
Midsummer Moon, (1987/Nov)
Seize the Fire, (1989/Oct)
The Prince of Midnight, (1990/Oct)
Flowers From the Storm, (1992/Oct)
The Dream Hunter, (1994/Dec)
My Sweet Folly, (1997/Jan)
Lessons in French, (2010/Feb)

Victorian Hearts Series
The Hidden Heart, (1986/Apr)
The Shadow and the Star, (1991/Oct)

Medieval Hearts Series
For My Lady's Heart, (1993/Dec)
Shadowheart, (2004/Apr)

References

Further reading
Laura Kinsale's Official Website
Laura Kinsale in Fantastic Fiction
Hedgehog Inc.com, Laura Kinsale's Audiobook publishing site

Living people
Year of birth missing (living people)
American romantic fiction writers
University of Texas at Austin alumni
RITA Award winners
Place of birth missing (living people)